Brittanie Nichole Cecil (March 20, 1988 – March 18, 2002) was a hockey fan who died from injuries suffered when a puck was deflected into the stands and struck her in the left temple at Nationwide Arena in Columbus, Ohio, on March 16, 2002. It was the first and currently only fan fatality in the NHL's history. Because of Cecil's death, the league implemented mandatory netting at both ends of the rink in every arena at the beginning of the next NHL season in 2002–03 to protect spectators from errant pucks.

Personal life
Born on March 20, 1988, Cecil was the daughter of David and Jody Cecil. A native of West Alexandria, Ohio, a rural community near Dayton, Cecil was an avid sports fan and soccer player, competing in a state tournament with her team, the Orange Crush, at eleven years old. After the team qualified for the state tournament, mayor Carol Lunsford declared the day Orange Crush Day. Cecil attended Twin Valley South Middle School as a cheerleader, student council member and an honor student. She attended Thompson Secondary School.

Death
Cecil was watching the Columbus Blue Jackets play the Calgary Flames on March 16, 2002, on tickets received as an early gift from her father for her 14th birthday. With 12:10 remaining in the second period, a shot by the Blue Jackets' Espen Knutsen was deflected by the Flames' Derek Morris and went over the glass behind the net, striking her in the left temple. Play carried on as the players were unaware of having accidentally caused any serious injury. Although Cecil had suffered a skull fracture, she walked to a first-aid station before being taken to Columbus Children's Hospital in an ambulance with her only visible injury being a gash on her forehead. At the hospital, she suffered an initial seizure and was admitted, but appeared to be recovering the next day, both communicative and ambulatory, and without complaints of pain or dizziness. A CT scan, however, had failed to catch a torn vertebral artery, resulting in severe clotting and swelling of the brain. On March 18, she developed a high fever and lost consciousness. She died nearly 48 hours after being struck, at 5:15 p.m. on March 18, 2002, two days before her 14th birthday.

Cecil's funeral was held at Preble Memory Gardens Chapel near West Alexandria, after which a procession of more than 150 cars followed the hearse to Fairview Cemetery, where she was buried.  Attending the funeral was Blue Jackets general manager Doug MacLean, who spoke on behalf of the team.

Aftermath
The Thursday after the incident, a moment of silence was observed for Cecil at the next Blue Jackets home game, played against the Detroit Red Wings. Her initials "BNC" were worn by the team's players on their helmets for the remainder of the season.

Knutsen and Morris expressed remorse following Cecil's death. Morris explained, "You try to say, 'It happens all the time,' but you can't. I don't know how many times pucks get deflected over the glass, but it doesn't make it any better. You can always say, 'It's not my fault,' but you always feel like it is, a little."  Knutsen, who was given the option of sitting out the next game by Blue Jackets coach Dave King but chose to play, told reporters, "I think about it all the time. It was a terrible accident, and I cannot get it off my mind."

In December 2010, Knutsen met with Cecil's family, bringing some closure to both parties.

Legacy

After the NHL spent several months studying the environment of the arena and spectator areas which determined that extra safety measures were required to lessen the risk of high-speed pucks entering the spectator areas, league commissioner Gary Bettman ordered the implementation of mandatory safety netting above the protective glass behind and to the sides of both ends of the rink by at least  atop the boards in all arenas. The netting has also been implemented by other hockey leagues and organizing bodies globally. A lawsuit brought by Cecil's family against the NHL and the arena was settled out of court for $1.2 million in April 2004. The Brittanie Nichole Cecil Memorial Scholarship Fund has since been created, which collects donations at every Blue Jackets home game.

References

External links
Brittanie Nichole Cecil Memorial Scholarship Fund
Columbus Dispatch interview with her family and with Espen Knutsen, published March 21, 2010 
 

Death of Brittanie Cecil
2001–02 NHL season
2002 in Ohio
Deaths by person in Ohio
March 2002 events in the United States
Sports deaths in Ohio
1988 births
2002 deaths
Child deaths